Gelli is a small settlement in the community and parish of Llawhaden, Pembrokeshire, Wales, at the confluence of the Syfynwy and Cleddau Ddu rivers. The nearest railway station is at Clunderwen  to the east. There was a woollen mill in Gelli that ceased production in 1938.

Bridges
Gelli Bridge, immediately to the east of Gelli, spans the Syfynwy a few yards before it joins the Eastern Cleddau and is Grade II listed; it is listed twice (with different IDs and dates) because it falls within two parishes. This listed bridge is not to be confused with several other bridges in the vicinity which carry road and rail across the Eastern Cleddau and another tributary.

Chapel
Siloam Welsh Baptist Church is in the centre of the hamlet. It was built in 1858 and rebuilt in 1904.

References

External links

Villages in Pembrokeshire